is a Japanese web manga series written and illustrated by Yuuki Kikuchi. The series, which depicts a crocodile's last 100 days before his death, was self-published on Twitter between December 12, 2019, and March 20, 2020. A manga compilation was published by Shougakukan on April 8, 2020. An anime film adaptation produced by TIA, titled , was scheduled to be released on May 28, 2021, but was delayed to July 9, 2021, due to the COVID-19 pandemic.

References

External links

2019 manga
Anime films based on manga
Anime postponed due to the COVID-19 pandemic
Films postponed due to the COVID-19 pandemic
Japanese webcomics
Manga adapted into films
Slice of life anime and manga
Shogakukan manga
Shōnen manga
Twitter
Webcomics in print